The University of Ciego de Ávila "Máximo Gómez Báez" (UNICA) is a public university located in Ciego de Ávila, Cuba. It was founded in 1978 and is organized in 7 Faculties.

Organization
These are the 5 faculties in which the university is divided into:

 Faculty of Engineering
 Faculty of Economics
 Faculty of Informatics
 Faculty of Agriculture
 Faculty of Social Sciences and Humanities

See also 

Education in Cuba
List of universities in Cuba
 Ciego de Ávila

External links
 University of Ciego de Ávila Website 

Ciego de Avila
Educational institutions established in 1978
Buildings and structures in Ciego de Ávila